Tan Boo Liat (1875–1934)  was a wealthy Singapore philanthropist. He was the son of Tan Soon Toh, grandson of Tan Kim Ching and great-grandson of Tan Tock Seng.

Educated locally, he was a member of the Singapore Volunteer Infantry and was among the contingent present at King Edward's coronation. As a descendant of the illustrious Tan Tock Seng family, he was the leader of the Hokkien Chinese community in Singapore, and chairman of the Po Chiak Keng Temple's Committee of Management, which the temple was built as the Tan clan ancestral temple and association. He was also a strong supporter of Dr. Sun Yat-sen, being a member of the Singapore T'ung Meng Hui along with Lim Boon Keng and Dr. S. C. Yin and a president of the Singapore Kuomintang. He headed the Fukien Protection Fund together with Tan Kah Kee collecting $130,000 during a nine-month campaign.

He was a trustee of the Anglo-Chinese School's Boarding School, and together with Dr. Lim Boon Keng, Sir Song Ong Siang and a few other Straits-born Chinese leaders, he initiated the Singapore Chinese Girls' School.  He also proposed the establishment of the Tao Nan School

He had a stable of a dozen racehorses. In 1898 his famous horse, Vanitas won the Viceroy's cup in Calcutta, India, the first time that a horse from the Straits Settlements or the Federated Malay States won this trophy, earning Tan Boo Liat $100,000.

He had strong commercial links to Thailand and was honoured by the King of Thailand, two of the things he had in common with his famous grandfather Tan Kim Ching. In 1920 he was awarded the title Phra Anukul Sayamkich.

He owned Golden Bell Mansion (built 1901) on Pender Road at the Mount Washington side of Mount Faber, Singapore. Dr. Sun Yat-sen stayed there on 15 December 1911 as did his wife and daughters (February 1912). After Tan Boo Liat's death in Shanghai in 1934 the house was sold. It is currently occupied by the Danish Seaman's Mission.

His daughter, Polly Tan Poh Li, married Seow Poh Leng after the death of his sister, Lilian Tan Luck Neo, Seow's first wife.

References

Further reading
Singapore: days of old - "A special commemorative history of Singapore published on the 10th Anniversary of Singapore Tatler."—Cover—published by Illustrated Magazine Publishing Co. Ltd. (Hong Kong), 1992, 
The Singapore house, 1819–1942, by Kip Lin Lee, Gretchen Liu, Published by Times Editions, Preservation of Monuments Board, 1988, 
A social history of the Chinese in Singapore and Malaya, 1800-1911 Volume 11 of Southeast Asia Publications, by Chʻing-huang Yen, Published by the Oxford University Press, 1986
Journal of the Malaysian Branch of the Royal Asiatic Society, Volumes 50-51 by  Royal Asiatic Society of Great Britain and Ireland. Malaysian Branch, Singapore, Published 1977
Journal of the Malaysian Branch of the Royal Asiatic Society, Volumes 56-58 by	Royal Asiatic Society of Great Britain and Ireland. Malaysian Branch, Singapore, Published 1983
A portrait of Malaysia and Singapore (Oxford progressive history) by Ding Eing Tan Published by the Oxford University Press, 1978, 
Parliamentary papers, Volume 61 By Great Britain. Parliament. House of Commons.  Item notes: v. 61 - 1909, Published by HMSO, 1909
Singapore: a pictorial history, 1819-2000 by Gretchen Liu, published by Routledge 2001, 
Journal of Southeast Asian studies, Volume 12 by  Cambridge University Press, Published by McGraw-Hill Far Eastern Publishers, 1981
Journal of Southeast Asian history, Volume 2 By University of Singapore. Dept. of History, University of Malaya (Singapore, Singapore). Dept. of History,  Item notes: v. 2 - 1961
The 1911 revolution: the Chinese in British and Dutch Southeast Asia (Asian studies series) by Lai To Lee, Published by Heinemann Asia, 1987, 
Studies in the Social History of China and South-east Asia - Essays in memory of Victor Purcell, edited by Jerome Ch'en & Nicholas Tarling, Cambridge University Press, 1970, Standard Book Number 521 07452 5
A History of Singapore By Ernest Chin Tiong Chew, Edwin Lee, Southeast Asian Studies Program (Institute of Southeast Asian Studies), Oxford University Press, 1991, 
Reconstructing identities: a social history of the Babas in Singapore by Jürgen Rudolph, Published by Ashgate, 1998, 
Tanjong Pagar, Singapore's cradle of development by Tanjong Pagar Citizens' Consultative Committee, Published by Tanjong Pagar Constituency, 1989, 
Plague fighter: the autobiography of a modern Chinese physician by Lien-tê Wu, Published by W. Heffer, 1959
Index to the correspondence of the Foreign Office for the year ..., Part 4 by Great Britain. Foreign Office, Published by Kraus-Thomson, 1969
Community and politics: the Chinese in colonial Singapore and Malaysia by Ching-huang Yen, Published by Times Academic Press, 1995, 
Wayang: a history of Chinese opera in Singapore by Gretchen Liu, Kuan Wah Pitt, Angelina Phillips, National Archives (Singapore) Published by the National Archives of Singapore, 
Street names of Singapore by Peter K. G. Dunlop Published by Who's Who Pub., 2000, 
The first 150 years of Singapore by Donald Moore, Joanna Moore Published by Donald Moore Press; [distributed by Cellar Book Shop, Detroit, Mich., 1969

1934 deaths
Racehorse owners and breeders
Singaporean people of Chinese descent
1875 births
People from British Malaya